Below is a list of notable country performers alphabetically by period, with each listing followed by a description of the artists' work.

Early innovators

The Carter Family, rural country-folk from Poor Valley, Virginia, known for hits like "Wildwood Flower", recorded the first commercially released country music records under producer Ralph Peer in Bristol, Tennessee. The Carter Family are regarded as the "First Family of Country Music", and founders of country music, along with Jimmie Rodgers.
Jimmie Rodgers, first solo country superstar, the undisputed "Father of Country Music". Rodgers recorded his first record under Ralph Peer in Bristol, Tennessee the day after the original Carter Family recorded theirs.
Gene Autry, began recording in the early 1930s before entering the film business and becoming the first Singing Cowboy. 
Vernon Dalhart recorded hundreds of songs until 1931.
Uncle Dave Macon, banjo player, singer, and songwriter who became the first star of the Grand Ole Opry in the late 1920s
Roy Acuff Grand Ole Opry star for 50 years, "King of Country Music".
Jenny Lou Carson, the first female to write a No. 1 Country Hit (1945) "You Two-Timed Me One Time Too Often".
Patsy Montana, the first female Country singer to sell 1 million records.
Girls of the Golden West, one of the first Country music duo groups.
Freddie Hart  In 1950 he moved to California and joined Lefty Frizzell's band shortly after when introduced to Capitol Records where Carl Smith recorded "Loose Talk: his very first number one song in 1955.
Ernest Tubb Beloved Texas troubadour who helped scores become stars.
Al Dexter, a country musician and songwriter, best known for "Pistol Packin' Mama," a 1944 hit that was one of the most popular recordings of the World War II years.
Minnie Pearl
Carl Perkins
Red Foley, the first major country star after World War II, host of Ozark Jubilee
Hank Snow Canadian-born Grand Ole Opry star famous for his traveling songs.
Hank Williams pioneer, singer, and songwriter, known for hits including "I'm So Lonesome I Could Cry", "Your Cheatin'   Heart" and "Jambalaya (On the Bayou)".
Bill Monroe, father of bluegrass music.
The Davis Sisters, best known for the hit "I Forgot More Than You'll Ever Know"
Louvin Brothers, inspired the Everly Brothers.
Little Jimmy Dickens 4-foot 11 inch star of the Grand Ole Opry.
Goldie Hill, the "golden hillbilly", best known for the hit song "I Let the Stars Get in My Eyes".
Wilf Carter, the "yodeling" cowboy, aka Montana Slim.
Jean Shepard, one of Country's leading female vocalists in the 1950s.
Webb Pierce, classic honky-tonker who dominated '50s country music.
Kitty Wells, country's first female superstar, called the "Queen of Country Music".
Johnny Cash created the boom-chicka-boom sound and recorded music from 1954 to 2003.
Ray Price, created the 4/4 shuffle which transformed traditional country music.
Glen Campbell, "The Rhinestone Cowboy," legendary session guitarist who launched out as a solo act and broke Country Music's 3-chord barrier and popularized "The Nashville sound" known for lush string and orchestral arrangements.
Woody Guthrie, wrote and sang the song "This Land is Your Land" and is cited by musicians from many genres as an inspiration.
Bob Wills, considered by many artist to be the real king of country music
Carl Smith, whose forceful and energetic voice on his hit singles such as "Loose Talk" and "Hey Joe!" can still be heard in country music today.

Performers of the Golden Age in the 1960s, 1970s and 1980s

Bill Anderson, singer who is still a major songwriter of new hits
Liz Anderson, as famous for her songwriting as her singing; mother of Lynn Anderson
Lynn Anderson, a California blonde who became a major country star in the 70s; helped by regular exposure on national television, was one of the first female artists to achieve major crossover success. Has won CMA, ACM, AMA, & Grammy Awards.  Named Billboard's "Artist of the Decade" (70-80).
Deborah Allen, a popular 80s country vocalist, songwriter. Best known for "Baby I Lied."
Eddy Arnold, the all-time hit leader by Joel Whitburn's point system
Moe Bandy, singer of the 70s/80s; paired with Joe Stampley on a series of recordings
The Browns, brother-sister trio
Glen Campbell, brought a whole new audience to Country Music with his TV show, co-starred with John Wayne in movie "True Grit," won many awards, top Country Music hitmaker and pop crossover icon.  He popularized "The Nashville Sound."
Bobby Bare is an American outlaw country music singer and songwriter, best known for the songs "Marie Laveau", "Detroit City" and "500 Miles Away From Home" and is the father of Bobby Bare Jr., also a musician.
Joe Carson, singer started in late 1950s Rockabilly and crossed to country. Died early 1960s.
June Carter, singer and comedian; star of the Grand Ole Opry; she became the wife and duet partner of Johnny Cash.
Johnny Cash, one of the single most Influential and popular country singers of all time. Best known for hits like "Ring of Fire", "Folsom Prison Blues" and "Cocaine Blues".  He died in 2003
Connie Cato, Capitol Records country artist recorded three albums in the 70s.  Her hits included "Super Skirt," and the top 20 hit "Hurt."  She stopped recording in the very early 80s with her final single "Roses for Sale."
Patsy Cline, immensely popular balladeer who died in 1963
David Allan Coe, Outlaw Country star of the 70s, wrote several outlaw themed songs, released several X-rated albums, which was unheard of in Country Music
Jessi Colter, Outlaw country singer and wife of Waylon Jennings, best known for "I'm Not Lisa"
John Conlee, had a string of hits from the late 70s to mid 80s, including his signature "Rose Colored Glasses."
Kin Vassy, singer-songwriter, who in addition to his solo recordings also recorded with other artists, most notably Kenny Rogers, Frank Zappa, and Elvis Presley. In 1980, he released two singles for the International Artists (IA) record label. He moved to Liberty Records label and released seven singles on it, including Earl Thomas Conley's "When You Were Blue and I Was Green", which reached number 21 on Hot Country Songs. Vassy continued to work with Kenny Rogers on various projects, such as his 1984 album What About Me. Vassy also composed the song "Kentucky Homemade Christmas" for Rogers, released on Christmas (Liberty Records, 1981).
Skeeter Davis, major female vocalist for decades
Mac Davis, country pop hitmaker in the 70s and 80s
Jimmy Dean, singer and TV personality, former owner of Jimmy Dean Sausage Company
John Denver, singer/songwriter of numerous hit songs throughout the 1970s including Annies song,Back Home Again, and Take Me Home, Country Roads. John Denver died in 1997.
Roy Drusky, smooth-singing Opry star for 40 years
Jimmy Martin, The King of bluegrass
Janie Fricke, known for her series of smooth Countrypolitan hits in the early 80s including "He's A Heartache" and "Don't Worry 'Bout Me Baby."
Lefty Frizzell, perhaps the greatest of the honky-tonkers
Crystal Gayle, sister of Loretta Lynn who became a Countrypolitan sensation in the 70s and 80s and had 18 No. 1's during this stretch. Best known for "Don't It Make My Brown Eyes Blue."
Bobbie Gentry, one of the first female artists to write and produce her own material.
Don Gibson, wrote and recorded many standards
Merle Haggard, popularized the Bakersfield sound
Tom T. Hall, "The Storyteller", wrote most of his many hits
Emmylou Harris has maintained one of the most artistically rewarding careers in country music
Hawkshaw Hawkins, Honky-tonk performer from Huntington, WV best known for the songs "Lonesome 7-7203" and "Pan American."  He died on March 5, 1963, in a plane crash alongside Patsy Cline and Cowboy Copas.
Johnny Horton a fantastic singer who met an untimely death that ended a wonderful career.
Jan Howard, pop-flavored female vocalist who sang pure country
Stonewall Jackson, honky-tonk icon
Sonny James, had a record 16 consecutive No. 1 hits
Wanda Jackson, honky-tonk female vocalist equally at home in rock and roll
Waylon Jennings, one of the leaders of the "outlaw"  country sound
George Jones, widely considered "the greatest country singer", No. 1 in charted hits
Dick Curless, Singer/songwriter known mostly for his trucking songs.
Kris Kristofferson, songwriter and one of the leaders of the "outlaw" country sound
k.d. lang, Canadian country-pop singer-songwriter, known for her campy performances, androgynous look, and mezzo-soprano range, winning CCMA's Entertainer of the Year Award in 1987, 1988, 1989, and 1990, Best Album 1988 for Shadowland, and the American Grammy Awards for Best Country Vocal Collaboration 1989 for "Crying" (shared with Roy Orbison), and Best Female Country Music Performance 1990, for Absolute Torch and Twang.
Myrna Lorrie, the first Lady of Canadian Country Music.
Loretta Lynn, arguably country music's biggest star in the 1960s and early 1970s.
Barbara Mandrell, first artist to win Country Music Association Entertainer of the Year twice (1980, 1981). Known for highly polished live concerts. Had the last successful prime-time network variety show on NBC 1980–1982. Charted over 50 country hits from the early 1970s thru the late 1980s. Could sing, dance and play over 10+ instruments.
Roger Miller, songwriter and Grammy record-breaker
Ronnie Milsap, country's first blind superstar and arguably the most popular country star of the late 1970s and early 1980s; scored 40 No. 1 hits (35 of which reached the top spot on Billboard)
Melba Montgomery, duet vocalist in the 60s, who launched a solo career in the 70s
Anne Murray, Prominent Canadian country-pop vocalist best known for the songs "Snowbird," "Could I Have This Dance," "You Needed Me," and others in the 1970s-1980s.
Willie Nelson, songwriter and one of the leaders of the outlaw country sound
Mickey Newbury, singer/songwriter started the lyric revolution in Nashville with his 1969 album Looks Like Rain. He wrote over 500 songs and has over 1000 covers to date. He was a songwriter's songwriter.
Marie Osmond, Youngest female to date to have a No. 1 country hit, with "Paper Roses" in 1973, and also had a string of country hits in the mid-1980s such as;"Meet Me in Montana" (with Dan Seals), "There's No Stopping Your Heart", "Read My Lips", "You're Still New To Me" (with Paul Davis), and "I Only Wanted You".
Norma Jean, gifted "hard country" vocalist, known also as Pretty Miss Norma Jean
Buck Owens, Hottest artist of the '60s, pioneer innovator of the Bakersfield sound
Gram Parsons, Parsons joined [the Byrds] in early 1968 after leaving his pioneering International Submarine Band, the Byrds recorded the seminal country rock album, Sweetheart of the Rodeo
Dolly Parton, one of the most successful female country artist in history. Country and pop music star, actress (most notably "9 to 5" and "Steel Magnolias"), songwriter. Best known for "I Will Always Love You," which she took to #1 on the country charts in 1974 and 1982; also covered by Whitney Houston for "The Bodyguard" soundtrack.
Ray Price, traditional country star of the '50s and '60s, who experienced pop success in the '70s and '80s
Charley Pride, the first black country music star in the 1970s and early 1980s.  Best known for "Kiss An Angel Good Mornin'."
Jeanne Pruett, female vocalist of the 70s, best known for the song "Satin Sheets"
Bonnie Raitt, an American blues singer-songwriter and a renowned slide guitar player
Susan Raye, Buck Owens' protégée who became a solo star with moderate success
Jim Reeves, crossover artist, invented Nashville Sound with Chet Atkins
Charlie Rich, '50s rock star who enjoyed greatest success in '70s country
Marty Robbins, one of the most popular artists in country music history.  Named artist of the decade (1960–1969) by the Academy of Country Music
Jeannie C. Riley, sexy girl in a miniskirt who socked it to the pop charts with "Harper Valley PTA."
Kenny Rogers, unique-voiced storyteller who also recorded love ballads and more rock material. He defined what was known as country crossover and became one of the biggest artists in country and any music genre.
Jeannie Seely, known as "Miss Country Soul"
Billy Joe Shaver, songwriter, wrote all but one song on Waylon Jennings' groundbreaking Honky Tonk Heroes album
Connie Smith, recorded "Once a Day, the longest stay at No. 1 for any female country artist
Margo Smith, known for her sexy come-on songs
Sammi Smith, best known for her "husky" voice and 1971 hit song "Help Me Make It Through the Night"
Sylvia, Countrypolitan sensation the early to mid-80s. Best known for pop-crossover hit "Nobody."
Billie Jo Spears, a hard-country vocalist with primarily international popularity
Ray Stevens, comedy crossover artist, Branson businessman
Mel Tillis, country music legend and father of country singer Pam Tillis.
Tanya Tucker, teen Country star whose career later spanned well beyond her teen years, from the mid-1970s to the late 1990s.
Conway Twitty, started in the 1950s as a rocker but started the country scene in the 1960s. A voice that scored 55 No. 1 hits (Had the most all time until 2006, when George Strait broke the record), released several songs in the 1970s and '80s that were controversial for the time, ("You've Never Been This Far Before", "I'd Love to Lay You Down", "Linda on My Mind")
Townes Van Zandt, songwriter, troubador
Porter Wagoner, pioneer on country television
Gene Watson, Texas country music cult legend, who gained national success after "Love in the Hot Afternoon"
Dottie West, one of country music's most influential and groundbreaking female artists
The Wilburn Brothers, popular male duet for decades
Don Williams, aka "The Gentle Giant" with many popular hits
Hank Williams Jr., Leader in the Outlaw country movement. Multi-instrumental talent, and song writing star. Won several awards. Son of Hank Williams Sr.
Tammy Wynette, three-time CMA top female vocalist
Faron Young, a country chart topper for three decades
Ferlin Husky, country music singer who was equally adept at the genres of traditional honky honk, ballads, spoken recitations, and rockabilly pop tunes
Hank Locklin, early honky-tonk singer-songwriter who had hits that charted from 1949 to 1971
Billy "Crash" Craddock, country rockabilly singer who first gained popularity in Australia in the 1950s with a string of rockabilly hits, including the Australian number one hits "Boom Boom Baby" and "One Last Kiss" and switched to country music, gaining popularity in the United States in the 1970s with a string of top ten country hits, several of which were number one hits. Craddock is known to his fans as "The King Of Country Rock Music" and "Mr. Country Rock" for his uptempo rock-influenced style of country music.
Stella Parton widely known for a series of country singers that charted during the mid-to-late 1970s. She is the younger sister of the country music entertainer Dolly Parton and the older sister of the singer Randy Parton and actress Rachel Dennison
Randy Parton was an American singer-songwriter, actor and businessman. He was the younger brother of Dolly Parton and Stella Parton and the older brother of actress Rachel Dennison. Parton was the first person to record the song "Roll On (Eighteen Wheeler)" in 1982. Two years later, Alabama recorded it, and became the group's 12th straight number 1 single. Also in 1984, Parton sang a song for the Rhinestone soundtrack, his sister Dolly starred in the film. He also played bass for his sister.
Johnny Rodriguez is an American country music singer. He is a Tejano and Texas country music singer, infusing his music with Latin sounds, and even singing verses of songs in Spanish. In the 1970s and 1980s, he was one of country music's most successful male artists, recording a string of hit songs, such as "You Always Come Back to Hurting Me," "Desperado," "Down on the Rio Grande" and "Foolin'." He has recorded six number 1 country hits in his career.

Country rock performers

The Allman Brothers Band, the most successful southern rock band in history
The Band, started out backing up Bob Dylan and their Music from Big Pink is a classic record
Black Oak Arkansas
Blackberry Smoke
Blackfoot
Jimmy Buffett
The Byrds
Glen Campbell
Charlie Daniels Band
Gene Clark
Commander Cody and His Lost Planet Airmen
Desert Rose Band
Eric Church
The Everly Brothers, predated others in this category but important figures in the transition from rockabilly to country rock
The First Edition
Flying Burrito Brothers
Kinky Friedman
Emmylou Harris
Heartsfield
KANE
The Kentucky Headhunters
Chris LeDoux
Marshall Tucker Band
Ricky Nelson, in the latter stage of his career, particularly on songs such as "Garden Party"
Michael Nesmith
New Riders of the Purple Sage
Juice Newton, the top-selling female country rocker of the 1980s
Nitty Gritty Dirt Band
Ozark Mountain Daredevils
Gram Parsons, a pioneer of the country rock and alt-country sound. A member of the International Submarine Band, The Byrds, and The Flying Burrito Brothers. 
Poco
Pure Prairie League (Vince Gill was the lead singer of this group on their biggest pop hit, 1980s "Let Me Love You Tonight.")
John Rich
Linda Ronstadt, in 1978 Country Music Magazine put her on the cover with the title "Queen Of Country Rock".
Southern Pacific (band)
Gary Stewart honky tonker and southern rocker, legendary throughout the '70s and early '80s.
Steve Young
Sasha Pieterse
Billy "Crash" Craddock, country rockabilly singer who first gained popularity in Australia in the 1950s with a string of rockabilly hits, including the Australian number one hits "Boom Boom Baby" and "One Last Kiss" and switched to country music, gaining popularity in the United States in the 1970s with a string of top ten country hits, several of which were number one hits. Craddock is known to his fans as "The King Of Country Rock Music" and "Mr. Country Rock" for his uptempo rock-influenced style of country music.

Early 1980s country-music performers

Alabama
Deborah Allen
John Anderson
Asleep at the Wheel
Johnny Cash
June Carter Cash
Rosanne Cash
David Allan Coe
John Conlee
Earl Thomas Conley
Rodney Crowell
Charlie Daniels
Leon Everette
Exile
Janie Fricke
Larry Gatlin
Crystal Gayle
Terri Gibbs
Mickey Gilley
Vern Gosdin
Lee Greenwood
Merle Haggard
Emmylou Harris
Freddie Hart
Waylon Jennings
George Jones
The Judds
Chris LeDoux
Johnny Lee
Patty Loveless 
Loretta Lynn
Barbara Mandrell
Irlene Mandrell
Louise Mandrell
Kathy Mattea
Charly McClain
Mel McDaniel
Reba McEntire
Ronnie Milsap
Gary Morris
Anne Murray
Willie Nelson
Juice Newton
Oak Ridge Boys
Marie Osmond
Dolly Parton
Charley Pride
Eddie Rabbitt
Eddy Raven
Restless Heart
Richard Lynch
Jerry Reed
Kenny Rogers
John Schneider
T.G. Sheppard
Ricky Skaggs
The Statler Brothers
George Strait
Sylvia
Conway Twitty
Steve Wariner
Dottie West
The Whites 
Don Williams
Hank Williams Jr.
Tammy Wynette
Boxcar Willie

Late-1980s country-music performers

Alabama
Deborah Allen
John Anderson
Asleep at the Wheel
Clint Black
T. Graham Brown
Doug Stone
Garth Brooks
Sawyer Brown
Carlene Carter
Lionel Cartwright
Johnny Cash
June Carter Cash
Rosanne Cash
David Allan Coe
John Conlee
Earl Thomas Conley
Rodney Crowell
Charlie Daniels
Holly Dunn
Skip Ewing
The Forester Sisters
Terri Gibbs
Vince Gill
Mickey Gilley
Vern Gosdin
Merle Haggard
Highway 101
Alan Jackson
Waylon Jennings
Chris LeDoux
Patty Loveless
Lyle Lovett
Loretta Lynn
Barbara Mandrell
Kathy Mattea
Mel McDaniel
Ronnie McDowell
Reba McEntire
Scott McQuaig
Ronnie Milsap
Gary Morris
Willie Nelson
K.T. Oslin
Dolly Parton
Eddie Rabbitt
Eddy Raven
Restless Heart
Judy Rodman
Kenny Rogers
John Schneider
Dan Seals
Ricky Van Shelton
T.G. Sheppard
Ricky Skaggs
The Statler Brothers
George Strait
Randy Travis
Tanya Tucker
Conway Twitty
Keith Whitley
Don Williams
Hank Williams Jr.
Tammy Wynette
Dwight Yoakam
Sons of the Desert (band)

Early-1990s country-music performers

Alabama
Deborah Allen
John Anderson
Clint Black
BlackHawk
Suzy Bogguss
Brooks & Dunn
Sawyer Brown
Garth Brooks
Restless Heart
Little Texas
Boy Howdy
Tracy Byrd
Mary Chapin Carpenter
Carlene Carter
Johnny Cash
June Carter Cash
Rosanne Cash
Kenny Chesney
Mark Chesnutt
Terri Clark
Mark Collie
Earl Thomas Conley
Rodney Crowell
Bobbie Cryner
Heather Myles
Billy Ray Cyrus
Charlie Daniels
Linda Davis
Billy Dean
Diamond Rio
Joe Diffie
George Ducas
Skip Ewing
Radney Foster
Vince Gill
Lee Greenwood
Joni Harms
Faith Hill
Merle Haggard
Highway 101
Alan Jackson
Waylon Jennings
George Jones
Wynonna Judd
Toby Keith
David Kersh
Sammy Kershaw
Hal Ketchum
Alison Krauss
Tracy Lawrence
Chris LeDoux
Patty Loveless
Lyle Lovett
Kathy Mattea
Martina McBride
McBride and the Ride
Neal McCoy
Reba McEntire
Tim McGraw
Ronnie Milsap
John Michael Montgomery
Lorrie Morgan
David Lee Murphy
Willie Nelson
K.T. Oslin
Lee Roy Parnell
Dolly Parton
Perfect Stranger
Pirates of the Mississippi
Eddie Rabbitt
Collin Raye
Dennis Robbins
Kenny Rogers
Ricky Van Shelton
Shenandoah
Ricky Skaggs
Sons of the Desert (band)
The Bellamy Brothers
The Kentucky Headhunters
The Oak Ridge Boys
The Statler Brothers
Doug Stone
George Strait
Marty Stuart
Doug Supernaw
Sweethearts of the Rodeo
Pam Tillis
Rick Tippe
Aaron Tippin
Randy Travis
Rick Trevino
Travis Tritt
Tanya Tucker
Shania Twain
Conway Twitty
Clay Walker
Steve Wariner
Western Flyer
Lari White
Keith Whitley
Hank Williams, Jr.
Kelly Willis
Tammy Wynette
Trisha Yearwood
Dwight Yoakam

Late-1990s country-music performers

Trace Adkins
Rhett Akins
Alabama
Deborah Allen
Gary Allan
John Anderson
Jessica Andrews
Ace Arlo
Asleep at the Wheel
John Berry
Clint Black
Blackhawk
James Bonamy
Brooks & Dunn
Garth Brooks
Tracy Byrd
Mary Chapin Carpenter
Deana Carter
Johnny Cash
June Carter Cash
Rosanne Cash
Kenny Chesney
Mark Chesnutt
Terri Clark
Confederate Railroad
Billy Ray Cyrus
Billy Dean
Diamond Rio
Joe Diffie
Dixie Chicks
George Ducas
Sara Evans
Skip Ewing
Vince Gill
Andy Griggs
Merle Haggard
Joni Harms
Wade Hayes
Ty Herndon
Faith Hill
Alan Jackson
Waylon Jennings
Johner Brothers
George Jones
Toby Keith
Sammy Kershaw
Alison Krauss
Tracy Lawrence
Chris LeDoux
Little Texas
Lonestar
Patty Loveless
Lyle Lovett
Kathy Mattea
Martina McBride
Neal McCoy
Lila McCann
Mindy McCready
Reba McEntire
Tim McGraw
Jo Dee Messina
John Michael Montgomery
Willie Nelson
Brad Paisley
Dolly Parton
Michael Peterson
Eddie Rabbitt
Collin Raye
LeAnn Rimes
Ricochet
Kenny Rogers
Sawyer Brown
Kevin Sharp
SHeDAISY
Shenandoah
Daryle Singletary
George Strait
Doug Supernaw
Pam Tillis
Rick Tippe
Aaron Tippin
The Tractors
Randy Travis
Rick Trevino
Travis Tritt
Shania Twain
Keith Urban
Rhonda Vincent
Clay Walker
Bryan White
Lari White
Hank Williams Jr.
Lee Ann Womack
Chely Wright
Tammy Wynette
Trisha Yearwood
The Kentucky Headhunters
The Oak Ridge Boys
The Bellamy Brothers

2000–2009 country-music performers

Trace Adkins
Alabama
Jason Aldean
Gary Allan
Rodney Atkins
Keith Anderson
Sherrie Austin
The Band Perry
Jeff Bates
Dierks Bentley
Big & Rich
Ryan Bingham
Clint Black
Blackberry Smoke
Bomshel
Paul Brandt
Lee Brice
Chad Brock
Doug Stone
Dean Brody
Brooks & Dunn
Garth Brooks
Luke Bryan
Laura Bell Bundy
Sarah Buxton
Tracy Byrd
Chris Cagle
Carolina Rain
Jason Michael Carroll
Kenny Chesney
Trailer Choir
Eric Church
Terri Clark
Confederate Railroad
Easton Corbin
Bucky Covington
Crossin Dixon
Billy Currington
Amy Dalley
Billy Dean
Diamond Rio
Joe Diffie
Dixie Chicks
Emerson Drive
Sara Evans
Jessie Farrell
Brantley Gilbert
Vince Gill
Gloriana
Danny Gokey
Josh Gracin
Pat Green
Andy Griggs
Halfway to Hazard
Joni Harms
Heartland
The Higgins
Faith Hill
Billy Hoffman
Steve Holy
Julianne Hough
Randy Houser
Jack Ingram
Alan Jackson
Jessie James
Jaron and the Long Road to Love
Jewel
Buddy Jewell
Erika Jo
Brad Johner
Carolyn Dawn Johnson
Jamey Johnson
Zona Jones
Toby Keith
Josh Kelley
Alison Krauss
Lady Antebellum
Miranda Lambert
Tracy Lawrence
Chris LeDoux
Aaron Lewis
Little Big Town
Lonestar
Love and Theft
Lyle Lovett
Martina McBride
Scotty McCreery
Reba McEntire
Tim McGraw
Jo Dee Messina
Montgomery Gentry
John Michael Montgomery
Justin Moore
Craig Morgan
Megan Mullins
Willie Nelson
Heidi Newfield
Gary Nichols
Joe Nichols
One More Girl
Jamie O'Neal
James Otto
Jake Owen
Brad Paisley
Danielle Peck
Kellie Pickler
Randy Rogers Band
Rascal Flatts
LeAnn Rimes
Julie Roberts
Kid Rock
Kenny Rogers
Darius Rucker
Rushlow
Kevin Sharp
Crystal Shawanda
Blake Shelton
Ashton Shepherd
Ricky Skaggs
Steve Miller Band
George Strait
Taylor Swift
Sugarland
Cyndi Thomson
Aaron Tippin
Rick Tippe
Trent Tomlinson
Trick Pony
Travis Tritt
Josh Turner
Shania Twain
Uncle Kracker
Carrie Underwood
Keith Urban
Phil Vassar
Clay Walker
Jimmy Wayne
Emily West
Whiskey Falls
Chuck Wicks
Hank Williams III
Trent Willmon
Mark Wills
Gretchen Wilson
Lee Ann Womack
Darryl Worley
The Wreckers
Chely Wright
Trisha Yearwood
Dwight Yoakam
Chris Young
Zac Brown Band

Modern country-music performers, since 2010

Luke Bell
Joni Harms
 A Thousand Horses
Aaron Lewis
Jason Cassidy
Zona Jones
Aaron Goodvin
Aaron Pritchett
Aaron Watson
Alan Jackson
Alison Krauss & Union Station
Andy Gibson
Ashley McBryde
Ashley Monroe
Ashton Shepherd
Bailey Zimmerman
Big & Rich
Big Kenny
Billy Craig
Billy Currington
Blackberry Smoke
Blaine Larsen
Blake Shelton
Bomshel
Brad Paisley
Brantley Gilbert
Breland
Brett Eldredge
Brett Kissel
Brett Young
Brooke Eden
Brooks & Dunn
Brothers Osborne
Bucky Covington
Caitlin & Will
Carly Pearce
Carrie Underwood
Casey James
Cassadee Pope
Chad Brownlee
Chase Rice
Chris Cagle
Chris Janson
Chris Lane
Chris Stapleton
Chris Young
Chuck Wicks
Clay Walker
Cody Johnson
Colt Ford
Cole Swindell
Corey Smith
Cory Marks
Craig Campbell
Craig Morgan
Cross Canadian Ragweed
Crossin Dixon
Dallas Smith
Dan + Shay
Danielle Bradbery – Best known for winning season four of The Voice
Danielle Peck
Danny Gokey
Darius Rucker
Darryl Worley
David Lee Murphy
David Nail
Dean Brody
Devin Dawson
Dierks Bentley
Dolly Parton
Doug Supernaw
Dustin Lynch
Dylan Scott
Easton Corbin
Edens Edge
Eli Young Band
Elle King
Emily West
Eric Church
Eric Paslay
Faith Hill
Florida Georgia Line
Frankie Ballard
Gabby Barrett
Garth Brooks
Gary Allan
George Strait
Gloriana
Granger Smith
Gretchen Wilson
Hank Williams Jr.
Hank Williams III
Hardy
Heidi Newfield
Ingrid Andress
The JaneDear Girls
Jack Ingram
Jade Eagleson
James Barker Band
James Otto
James Wesley
Jamey Johnson
Jana Kramer
Jaron and the Long Road to Love
Jason Michael Carroll
JB and the Moonshine Band
JellyRoll
Jennette McCurdy
Jerrod Niemann
Jessica Harp
Jessie James
Jewel
Jimmy Wayne
Jimmie Allen
Jo Dee Messina
Joe Nichols
Joey + Rory
John Rich
Jon Pardi
Jordan Davis
Josh Abbott Band
Josh Gracin
Josh Kelley
Josh Ross
Josh Thompson
Josh Turner
JT Hodges
Julianne Hough
Justin Moore
Kacey Musgraves
Kane Brown
Keith Anderson
Keith Urban
Kellie Pickler
Kelly Clarkson
Kelsea Ballerini
Kenny Chesney
Kevin Fowler
Kevin Sharp
Kid Rock
Kip Moore
Kira Isabella
Kix Brooks
Kristin Chenoweth
The Lacs
Lady Antebellum
Lanco (band)
Laura Bell Bundy
Lauren Alaina
LeAnn Rimes
Lee Ann Womack
Lee Brice
Little Big Town
LoCash Cowboys
Lonestar
The Lost Trailers
Love and Theft
Luke Bryan
Luke Combs
Lyle Lovett
MacKenzie Porter
Maren Morris
Mark Chesnutt
Mark Wills
Martina McBride
Mason Ramsey
Matt Kennon
Matt Lang
Matt Mason
Matt Stell
Marty Stuart
Michael Ray
Michelle Branch
Mickey Guyton
Midland (band)
Miranda Lambert
Miss Willie Brown
Mitchell Tenpenny
Montgomery Gentry
Morgan Evans
Morgan Wallen
Nate Haller
Niko Moon
Old Dominion
Parker McCollum
Parmalee
Pat Green
Phil Vassar
Pistol Annies
RaeLynn
Randy Houser
Randy Montana
Randy Travis
Rascal Flatts
Reba McEntire
Reckless Kelly
Riley Green (singer)
Rob Georg
Robyn Ottolini
Rodney Atkins
Ronnie Dunn
Rose Falcon
Russell Dickerson
Ryan Hurd
Sam Hunt
Sara Evans
Sarah Buxton
Sarah Darling
Sasha Pieterse
Scotty McCreery
Shania Twain
Sheryl Crow
Shooter Jennings
Skylar Laine
Steel Magnolia
Steve Azar
Steve Earle
Steve Holy
Struggle Jennings
Sugarland
Sunny Sweeney
Taylor Swift
Terri Clark
The Henningsens
The Reklaws
Thomas Rhett
Thompson Square
Tim McGraw
Trace Adkins
Tracy Lawrence
Trailer Choir
Trent Harmon
Trent Tomlinson
Trey Lewis
Toby Keith
Travis Denning
Troy Olsen
Tyler Childers
Tyler Farr
Tyler Joe Miller
Uncle Kracker
Upchurch
Walker Hayes
Wheeler Walker Jr.
Whitney Duncan
Willie Nelson
Wynonna
Zac Brown Band
Zach Bryan

See also

 List of country music performers

References

 
Country music
 Era